Michel Camilo  is an eponymous album by pianist Michel Camilo, recorded and released in 1989.

Recording and release
The album was recorded in January and February 1989. It was released by CBS Portrait.

Track listing 
Suite Sandrine, Pt. 1 
Nostalgia 
Dreamlight 
Crossroads 
Sunset (Interlude I/Suite Sandrine)
Yarey
Pra Voce (For Tania Maria) 
Blue Bossa
Caribe

Personnel 

Michel Camilo - Piano 
Marc Johnson - Bass 
Lincoln Goines - Bass 
Joel Rosenblatt – Drums
Dave Weckl - Drums 
Mongo Santamaría - Conga

References

External links
Michel Camilo Discography

1988 albums
Michel Camilo albums